XHPAZ-FM is a radio station in La Paz, Baja California Sur.

References

External links
 Radio Locator information on XHPAZ

Radio stations in La Paz, Baja California Sur